"By Crooked Steps" is a song by American rock band Soundgarden. It is the second single from their album, King Animal. The song premiered on television November 27, 2012, on Jimmy Kimmel Live!. It reached number 1 on the US Mainstream Rock chart.

Music video
The music video for "By Crooked Steps" was directed by Dave Grohl. The video depicts Soundgarden as a motorcycle gang who rides Segways. Midway through the video, the band is shown shutting off an electronic music DJ's laptop, then taking over the stage and playing a show. The DJ proceeds to call the cops, and then the band flees the stage and rides again on the Segways with police in pursuit, ending with the band being arrested. One of the police officers who was arresting the band was played by electronic music artist Deadmau5. Rolling Stone referred to Soundgarden in the video as "badass." Soundgarden drummer Matt Cameron said he felt it was "refreshing" that Dave Grohl decided to make a humorous video for "By Crooked Steps" when it is such a serious song. Cameron went on to say that this was a new experience since Soundgarden had only made "more traditional rock music videos" in the past.

Charts

References

External links

Soundgarden songs
2012 songs
Song recordings produced by Adam Kasper
Songs written by Chris Cornell
Songs written by Ben Shepherd
Songs written by Matt Cameron
Songs written by Kim Thayil
2013 singles
Republic Records singles